Quito is an unincorporated community located in Leflore County, Mississippi.

It is part of the Greenwood, Mississippi micropolitan area.

Quito is located on the former Columbus and Greenville Railroad. A post office operated under the name Quito from 1907 to 1918.

It was once believed that blues musician Robert Johnson was buried in the Payne Chapel cemetery, but evidence now points to him being buried at Little Zion M.B. Church Cemetery north of Greenwood.

Gallery

References

Unincorporated communities in Leflore County, Mississippi
Unincorporated communities in Mississippi
Greenwood, Mississippi micropolitan area